Sabinebukta is a bay at the northern side of Nordaustlandet, Svalbard. The bay is split into Vestre Sabinevågen and Austre Sabinevågen. The Sabine Islands are located in the outer part of the bay. The bay is named after Arctic explorer Edward Sabine.

References

Bays of Svalbard
Nordaustlandet